The 2016–17 FIBA Europe Cup play-offs begin on 8 February and conclude on 19 and 26 April 2017, with the 2017 FIBA Europe Cup Finals, to decide the champions of the 2016–17 FIBA Europe Cup. A total of 16 teams competed in the play-offs.

Times up to 25 March 2017 (round of 16) are CET (UTC+1), thereafter (quarter-finals and beyond) times are CEST (UTC+2).

Format
The play-offs involves 16 teams which qualified as winners of each one of the six groups in the second round, the two best runners-up and eight teams from the Basketball Champions League group stage.

Each tie in the knockout phase, is played over two legs, with each team playing one leg at home.

The draw was made without any restriction or seeding, being decided all the bracket by the luck of the draw in the round of 16.

Qualified teams

Second round group winners and runners-up
The six group winners from the second round advanced to the play-offs, along with the two best second placed teams.

Transfers from Champions League regular season
Eight teams from the 2016–17 Basketball Champions League Regular season transfer to the FIBA Europe Cup. These include the worst fifth-placed team, all sixth-placed teams and the two best seventh-placed teams.

Bracket

Round of 16
The first legs will be played on 8 February, and the second legs will be played on 22 February 2017. Team 1 plays the second leg at home.

|}

First leg

Second leg

Quarter-finals
The first legs will be played on 8 March, and the second legs will be played on 15 March 2017.

|}

First leg

Second leg

Semi-finals
The first legs will be played on 29 March, and the second legs will be played on 5 April 2017.

|}

First leg

Second leg

Final

The first leg of the Final was played on 18 April and the second leg was played on 25 April 2017.

|}

First leg

Second leg

References

External links
 

2016–17 FIBA Europe Cup
FIBA Europe Cup Play-offs